Ruth Maleczech (January 8, 1939 – September 30, 2013) was an American avant-garde stage actress. She won three Obie Awards for Best Actress in her career, for Hajj (1983), Through the Leaves, (1984) and Lear (1990) and an Obie Award for Design, shared with Julie Archer, for Vanishing Pictures (1980), which she also directed. Her performance as Lear was widely acclaimed: her King Lear was portrayed as an imperious Southern matriarch.

Life and career

Maleczech was born in Cleveland, Ohio as Ruth Sophia Reinprecht, to Frank Reinprecht (1912–1982) and Elizabeth (née Maletich, originally Maletić) Reinprecht (1914–1996), who emigrated from  Yugoslavia. Her parents were a steel worker and seamstress, respectively. She had two siblings, Frank and Patricia, with whom she was raised in Phoenix, Arizona.

Maleczech was the first in her family to attend college, beginning theater studies at UCLA at 16. From there she went to San Francisco to work, where she met Mabou Mines co-founder Lee Breuer. The two became a couple and, in 1964, they went to Paris and for six years earned money dubbing films, sufficient to fund their burgeoning theatrical experiments.

In France, Maleczech and JoAnne Akalaitis studied with the Polish director and drama theorist Jerzy Grotowski; Maleczech also spent a month in East Berlin studying, observing rehearsals and attending performances by Bertolt Brecht's storied Berliner Ensemble. Returning to the United States, Maleczech co-founded the experimental N.Y.C. theater company Mabou Mines, in 1970, along with Akalaitis, Breuer, Philip Glass and David Warrilow. Maleczech collaborated on nearly every piece Mabou Mines produced. She adopted a phonetic spelling of her mother's maiden name as her professional name (Maletich → Maleczech).
 
She directed/adapted several works: Wrong Guys, from the hard-boiled novel by Jim Strahs; Vanishing Pictures, based on Poe's Mystery of Marie Roget; Samuel Beckett's Imagination Dead Imagine (as a hologram); The Bribe by Terry O'Reilly; her own Sueños, inspired by the life of Sor Juana Inez de la Cruz; Belén: A Book of Hours, written by Catherine Sasanov; and Song For New York.

In addition to working together for a half century, she and Breuer had two children. They legally married in New York in 1978.

Outside of Mabou Mines, Maleczech created Fire Works with Valeria Vasilevski and collaborated and worked with, among others, Peter Sellars, Frederick Wiseman and Martha Clarke. She appeared in numerous feature films, commercial and independent, and on television in Law & Order and ER.

Death
Ruth Maleczech died at age 74 from breast cancer and chronic obstructive pulmonary disease at her son's home in Brooklyn. She is survived by her husband, son (Lute Breuer), daughter (Clove Galilee) and a granddaughter (Bella Breuer). She was also survived by two siblings, Frank A. Reinprecht and Mrs. Patricia Adams, and various nieces and nephews.

Selected awards

Obie Awards
 Best Performance, Mabou Mines Lear - 1990
 Best Performance, Hajj - 1983
 Best Performance, Through the Leaves - 1984
 Best Design (shared with Julie Archer), Vanishing Pictures - 1980
 Sustained Achievement, Mabou Mines - 1986

Villager Downtown Theater Awards
Best Solo Performance, Hajj - 1990
Best Director, Wrong Guys - 1981
Best Director, Vanishing Pictures - 1980
Best Ensemble, Shaggy Dog Animation - 1978

Other Awards
 For Lifetime Dedication to Not-For-Profit Theatre (2001)
 Cairo International Festival for Experimental Theatre: Certificate of Outstanding Merit for her "influential, pioneering role in experimental theatre" (2006)
 Edwin Booth Award: To the Artistic Directors of Mabou Mines for Contributions to Theatre (2007)
 Foundation for Contemporary Arts Grants to Artists award (2009)
 Otto René Castillo Award for Political Theatre (2010)
 USA Gracie Fellow in Theater Arts by United States Artists (2010)
 Inductee (posthumously) into the Off Broadway Hall of Fame by The Off Broadway Alliance (2014)

Filmography

References

External links
 
 

1939 births
2013 deaths
American stage actresses
American television actresses
Actresses from Phoenix, Arizona
Deaths from cancer in New York (state)
Deaths from breast cancer
Deaths from emphysema
University of California, Los Angeles alumni
20th-century American actresses
American people of Yugoslav descent
Obie Award recipients
21st-century American women